Penrose Peak is a mountain in the Bighorn Mountains of the Rocky Mountains in Wyoming, United States.  Like Mount Penrose in British Columbia, Canada, it was named for Senator Boies Penrose of Pennsylvania, who was an avid outdoorsman and went on hunting expeditions in this area.

References

Mountains of Wyoming
Rocky Mountains
Mountains of Johnson County, Wyoming